Hibbertia australis is a species of flowering plant in the family Dilleniaceae and is endemic to south-eastern continental Australia. It is an erect to spreading shrub with linear leaves and yellow flowers with four to nine stamens arranged in a single cluster.

Description
There are four to nine stamens in a single cluster on one side of the felty-hairy carpels. Flowering occurs between September and December.

Taxonomy
Hibbertia australis was first formally described in 1955 by Norman Arthur Wakefield in The Victorian Naturalist from specimens collected at Marcus Hill in 1884. The specific epithet (australis) means "southern".

Distribution and habitat
This hibbertia usually grows in heath or woodland and occurs in southern and western Victoria and as far west as the Eyre Peninsula in South Australia.

See also
List of Hibbertia species

References

australis
Flora of Victoria (Australia)
Flora of South Australia
Plants described in 1955